Kryptos is an encrypted sculpture on the grounds of the US Central Intelligence Agency.

Kryptos may also refer to:

 Kryptos (gastropod), a genus of marine snails in the family Buccinidae
 Kryptos (band), an Indian heavy metal band
 "Kryptos", an episode of the British television series Eleventh Hour
 Kryptos, an album by Andreas Vollenweider

See also
 Kryptops, a genus of theropod dinosaur
 Cryptos, in the list of Dan Dare stories
 Krypto (disambiguation)